Anne Pressly (August 28, 1982 – October 25, 2008) was an American news anchor for KATV Channel 7 in Little Rock, Arkansas. She was born in Beaufort, South Carolina and grew up in Greenville. She moved to Little Rock during her high school junior year when her mother remarried. On October 20, 2008, she was brutally attacked during a robbery at her home and died five days later.

Biography
After earning her B.A. in Political Science from Rhodes College in Memphis, Tennessee, Pressly was hired at KATV in May 2004 to produce Good Morning Arkansas and report for MidDay Arkansas and Saturday Daybreak. She was promoted to a full-time reporter position in November, 2004.

A chance encounter with a casting director while working on a story helped her land a small role as Candice Black, a conservative commentator, in Oliver Stone's 2008 film W.

Attack and death

Anne Pressly was found at 4:30 a.m. on October 20, 2008, a half-hour before she was due to appear on the station's Daybreak program. Little Rock police were alerted by her mother, Patricia Cannady, when Pressly did not answer her wake-up call. Cannady found Pressly unresponsive in her bed with injuries sustained to her head and upper body consistent with a beating. She had been raped, her left hand had been broken, and her face had been crushed beyond recognition. The attacker took her laptop computer, her handbag with a credit card, and little else.

Robbery
Little Rock Police Department spokesman Cassandra Davis said police did not believe that she was intentionally targeted, but robbery was the suspected motive after her purse was discovered missing. Her credit card was used at a service station several miles away, sometime after Cannady had discovered her daughter.

Pressly owned two cocker spaniels  and it was theorized the attacker gained entrance to her home via a dog door.

Hospitalization and death
Pressly was hospitalized at St. Vincent Infirmary Medical Center and died five days later on October 25, 2008.

On the evening of her death, Pressly's mother and stepfather released a statement:

Memorial service and reward

A memorial service for Pressly was scheduled for October 30, 2008. KATV set up a reward fund for information on Pressly's murder and the fund exceeded $50,000. Her family requested that either contributions be made to the fund or a scholarship fund established in her name.

Pressly's alma mater, Rhodes College, expressed a desire to honor her by either establishing a memorial, setting up a scholarship, or supporting her favorite charity.

Perpetrator
On November 26, 2008, police in Little Rock, Arkansas arrested Curtis Lavelle Vance for the murder of Pressly. On November 11, 2009, Vance was convicted of capital murder, residential burglary, rape and theft of property.

Police believe Vance committed a crime of opportunity, and they found no link between Pressly's public profession and her attack
. The following day, he was sentenced to life in prison without parole.

After Vance's sentencing, an interview was being conducted outside the courtroom with David Bazzell, a local radio personality and a friend of Pressly. Bazzell stated that he felt justice had been carried out. Vance's enraged mother was standing nearby and overheard the comment, shouting at Bazzell, "No it wasn't! No it wasn't! My son is innocent! No justice here today!" DNA evidence had proven that Vance was Pressly's rapist and attacker.

The Arkansas Supreme Court rejected Vance's appeal on June 2, 2011.

Vance was also charged with the rape of Kristen Edwards on April 21, 2008 at her home in Marianna, Arkansas.  Before he fled, the rapist stole her cell phone and charger, a video and $3 – all the cash she had with her at the time. Vance was subjected to a swab test for his DNA and all 16 genetic markers the test compared matched the DNA recovered from the semen in Edwards's rape. During the trial, Vance admitted under questioning that he had been inside Edwards's home on the morning of the rape, although he claimed that it was because "there were mobs roaming the streets in Little Rock" that morning and he was afraid. Despite his admission of being in the victim's home, her being brutally raped that morning, and the statistically negligible chance of his DNA matching anyone else's, the jury was hung, resulting in a mistrial.

References

External links

News.AOL.com - TV Anchorwoman Attacked in Her Home
Unknown Anne Pressly Killer America's Most Wanted Case File

American film actresses
American television news anchors
Journalists killed in the United States
Murdered American journalists
People from Greenville, South Carolina
People from Little Rock, Arkansas
People murdered in Arkansas
Deaths by beating in the United States
1982 births
2008 deaths
2008 murders in the United States
American women television journalists
Incidents of violence against women
Female murder victims
20th-century American actresses
21st-century American women
History of women in Arkansas